Dichomeris acrolychna is a moth in the family Gelechiidae. It was described by Edward Meyrick in 1922. It is found in Pará, Brazil.
The forewings are rather dark ashy fuscous, obscurely whitish speckled. The stigmata are dark fuscous or ferruginous brown, the plical somewhat beyond the first discal. There is a curved dark ferruginous-brown subterminal shade sometimes perceptible. The hindwings are dark grey.

References

Moths described in 1922
acrolychna